Carey McWilliams may refer to:

Carey McWilliams (journalist) (1905–1980), American journalist and lawyer
Carey McWilliams (marksman) (born 1973), blind marksman, author, and skydiver

See also
Wilson Carey McWilliams (1933–2005), political scientist